Father Cigarette may refer to:

 Father Cigarette (1946 film), a 1946 Chilean comedy film
 Father Cigarette (1955 film), a 1955 Spanish-Portuguese comedy film